= Sharp Infobar C01 =

2012 smartphone model

INFOBAR C01
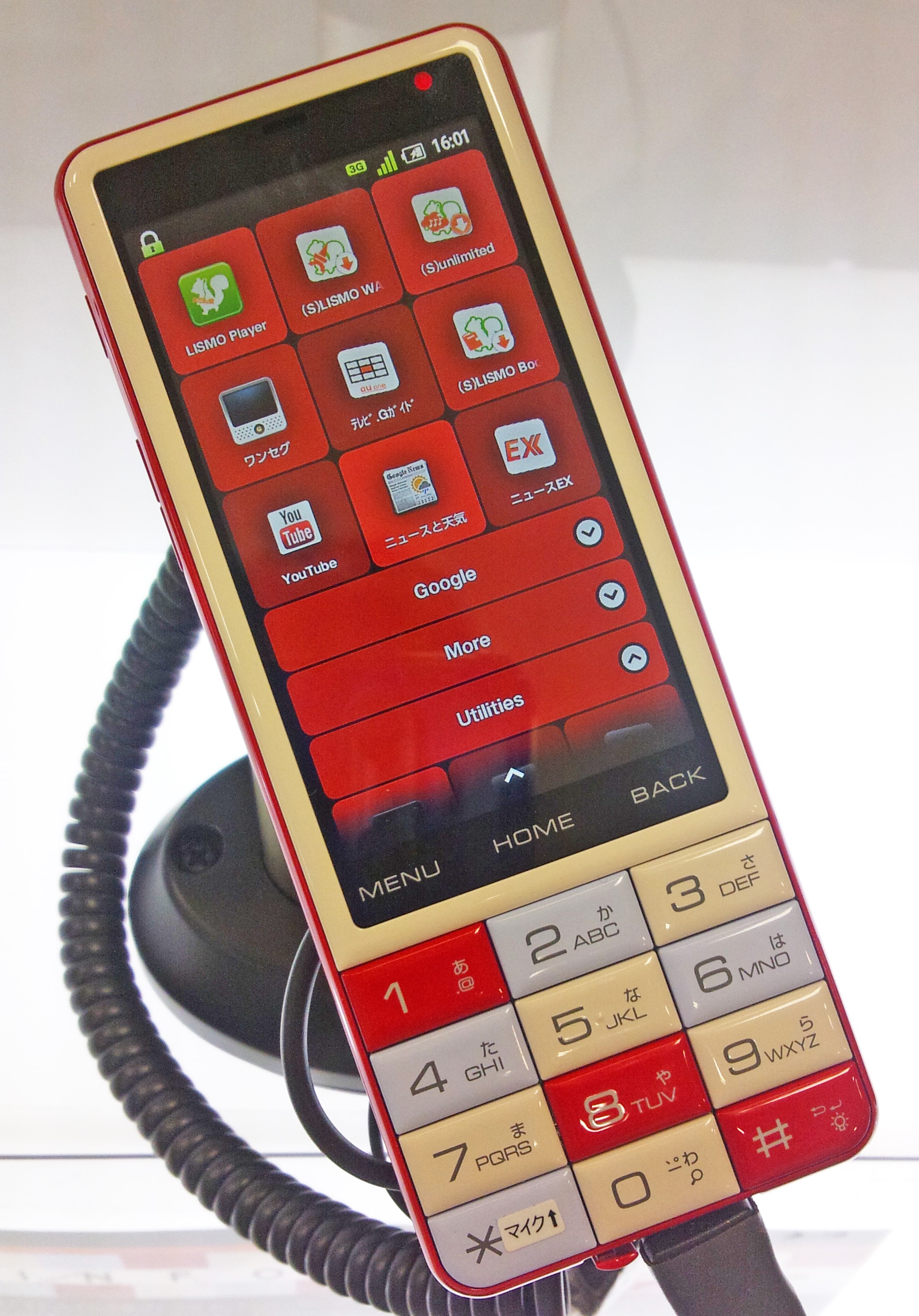
- INFOBAR C01 (NISHIKIGOI)
- Brand: au
- Manufacturer: Sharp
- First released: February 3, 2012
- Discontinued: April 2013
- Compatible networks: 3G: CDMA 1X (CDMA2000 1xMC); 2G: GSM (900 MHz / 1.8 GHz / 1.9 GHz); 3.5G: CDMA 1X WIN (WIN HIGH SPEED/Packet WIN) (CDMA2000 1xEV-DO MC-Rev.A/Rev.A/Rel.0); Wi-Fi (IEEE 802.11b/g/n)
- Form factor: Candybar with numeric keypad
- Colors: NISHIKIGOI; KIIRO; ICHIMATSU
- Dimensions: 130 mm (5.1 in) H 52 mm (2.0 in) W 12.3 mm (0.48 in) D
- Weight: 106 g (3.7 oz)
- Operating system: Android 2.3.6
- System-on-chip: Qualcomm Snapdragon S2
- CPU: 1.4 GHz MSM8655T
- Memory: 512 MB RAM
- Storage: 4 GB ROM (1 GB application area)
- Removable storage: microSD (up to 2 GB), microSDHC (up to 32 GB)
- Battery: 1020 mAh
- Rear camera: 8.04 MP CMOS, autofocus
- Front camera: None
- Display: 3.2 in (81 mm) TFT LCD; FWVGA (480×854 pixels); 260,000 colors
- Model: SHX12 (Manufacturer code: AF30)
- Made in: China

The INFOBAR C01 (SHX12) is an Android smartphone manufactured by Sharp Corporation for the Japanese carrier au (KDDI and Okinawa Cellular Telephone Company), featuring a candybar form factor with a physical numeric keypad and running on the CDMA 1X WIN network.

== History ==
On January 7, 2012, the device passed Federal Communications Commission (FCC) certification. KDDI officially announced the INFOBAR C01 on January 16, 2012, and launched it nationwide on February 3, 2012.

KDDI has released a software update for two Sharp Android smartphones: the INFOBAR C01 and the AQUOS PHONE SERIE ISW16SH. The update fixes a bug where SMS messages (C-mail) could not be received in sleep mode when designated as a target app under "Eco-Tech" settings. The installation takes roughly 10 minutes.

== Specifications ==
=== Hardware ===
The INFOBAR C01 is configured in a candybar layout with an integrated physical numeric keypad, measuring 52 mm wide, 130 mm tall, and 12.3 mm thick with a total weight of approximately 106 g. The device features a 3.2-inch TFT LCD touchscreen display with a resolution of 480×854 (FWVGA) displaying roughly 260,000 colors, though it lacks a directional pad, requiring text conversion and call controls to be operated via touchscreen interaction. Under the hood, it is powered by a 1.4 GHz Qualcomm Snapdragon S2 (MSM8655T) processor paired with 512 MB of RAM and 4 GB of internal storage (1 GB allocated for apps), with support for expansion via microSD (up to 2 GB) and microSDHC (up to 32 GB) cards.

The phone is equipped with an 8.04-megapixel rear CMOS camera with autofocus capabilities, while no front-facing camera is included. Power is supplied by a removable 1020 mAh battery, delivering up to 370 minutes of continuous talk time and 350 hours of continuous standby time (when Wi-Fi and the accelerometer are disabled). Additional hardware features include infrared communication (IrSimple), Bluetooth 3.0+HS, FeliCa (Osaifu-Keitai), 1seg TV reception, a 6-axis motion sensor, a 0.377 W/kg SAR rating, and connectivity across 3G (CDMA2000 1xMC, WIN HIGH SPEED), 2G GSM networks, and Wi-Fi (IEEE 802.11b/g/n).

=== Software ===
The smartphone operates on Android OS 2.3.6 layered with the custom iida UI, featuring an updated lock screen that supports flick gestures to trigger user-assigned app shortcuts. The system includes pre-installed software such as a standard Web browser, LISMO! for Android (with music and video playback functionality), LISMO WAVE, Gmail, PC mail, and the KDDI E-mail application (with Deco-mail support over 3G and Wi-Fi networks).

Additional pre-installed software and integrated services include Skype au, PC document viewing, Earthquake Early Warnings, au Smart Sports suite, au one Navi Walk, au one News EX, Jibun Bank, and full compatibility with the Anshin Security Pack suite.
